Modern Burdens is a 2017 studio album by American alternative rock musician Tracy Bonham, re-recording her 1996 debut release The Burdens of Being Upright. This release received positive critical reception. Recording was enabled by a crowdfunding campaign on PledgeMusic and the album was supported with a tour.

Reception
In Rolling Stone, Maura Johnston gave this album four out of five stars, calling it "a lovingly penned postcard to Bonham’s past self, and a fascinating look at where she’s at right now"; the publication named it one of the 50 best albums of 2017. Writing for ABC News, Allan Raible gave this release four out of five stars, noting the difference in tone as Bonham has aged and calling several tracks for their radical reinterpretation of her work.

Track listing
All songs written by Tracy Bonham
"Mother Mother" – 3:17
"Navy Bean" – 4:26
"Tell It to the Sky" – 4:33
"Kisses" – 2:51
"Brain Crack" – 3:25
"The One" – 4:59
"One Hit Wonder" – 3:40
"Sharks Can’t Sleep" – 5:11
"Bulldog" – 2:58
"Every Breath" – 1:48
"30 Seconds" – 3:16
"The Real" – 3:22
"Free" – 3:56

Personnel
Tracy Bonham – guitar, vocals, backing vocals, violin, strings, piano, synthesizer, bass guitar, drums, drum programming
Nicole Atkins – vocals on "Tell It to the Sky"
Kathryn Calder – vocals, piano, and keyboards on "Brain Crack"
Jesse Cannon – post-production drum mixing on "30 Seconds"
Dave Cook – live drum recording at Levon Helm Studios on "30 Seconds"
Tanya Donnelly – vocals on "Sharks Can’t Sleep"
Sadie Dupuis – vocals and guitar on "The Real"
Chris Dyas – guitar
Michael Eisenstein – lead vocals recording at Death Star Studio on "Every Breath"
Peter Fox – recording at Pearl St Studios on "One Hit Wonder" (drums only) and "The One"
John Givens – design
Kay Hanley – vocals on "Every Breath"
Angie Hart – vocals on "30 Seconds"
Olive Hui – background vocals
Scott Janowitz – lead vocal recording at Appletone Studios on "Sharks Can't Sleep"
Wendy MacNaughton – cover illustration
Joe Magistro – drums
Bill McDonald – lead vocals recording at The Scouthall on "30 Seconds"
Konrad Meissner – drums
Todd Perlmutter – drums, recording, mixing at Captain's Cove Studios on "Mother Mother"
PledgeMusic background vocalists
Jem Boere
Gillian Clopton
Katia Dotto
Vincent Earle
Christopher Elliot
Kate Eppers
Nick Ford
Howard Frankel
John Hernandez
Stitch Mayo
Ingelin Sandtorp Olsen
Caspi Oron
Leanna Phifer
Matthew Velazquez
Renee Valdez
David Young
Kevin Salem – mastering at The Distortion Tank
Andrew Sherman – organ
Jeff Turlik – guitar
Lisa Stockton-Wilson – background vocals
John Wlaysewski – guitar, loops, synths, bass guitar, bass synth, synthesizer, samples, drums, drum loops, drum machine, drum programming, percussion, tambourine, recording, mixing, production
Rachael Yamagata – vocals on "Kisses"

See also
List of 2017 albums

References

External links

Tracy Bonham: My 5 Favorite Nineties Songs

2017 albums
Tracy Bonham albums
Crowdfunded albums